Moon in the Scorpio is the debut studio album by the Norwegian symphonic black metal band Limbonic Art. It was recorded at Bondi Lydstudio and released in July 1996 through Nocturnal Art Productions.

Cover artwork is done by band member Morpheus.

Track listing

Personnel
Daemon – lead vocals, guitars, bass
Morfeus – keyboards, lead guitars, drum programming, vocals
Morgana – additional vocals, photography

External links
Moon in the Scorpio at Allmusic

1996 debut albums
Limbonic Art albums